The 1930 SANFL Grand Final was an Australian rules football competition. North Adelaide beat Port Adelaide 67 to 64.

Teams

References 

SANFL Grand Finals
SANFL Grand Final, 1930
October 1930 sports events